The Rivière Rouge East is a tributary of the east bank of the Rouge River. This stream flows in the municipality of Château-Richer, in the La Jacques-Cartier Regional County Municipality, in the administrative region of Capitale-Nationale, in the province from Quebec, to Canada.

The upper part of this forest valley surrounded by mountains is served by a forest road from the south. While the Saint-Achillée road passes on the north side of the lower part. Forestry is the main economic activity in this valley; second, recreational tourism.

Because of its altitude, the surface of the upper part of the Rouge East River is generally frozen from the end of November to the beginning of April; however, safe circulation on the ice is generally done from mid-December to the end of March. The water level of the river varies with the seasons and the precipitation; the spring flood occurs in March or April.

Geography 
The Rouge East River takes its source from Lac Grand landlocked between the mountains. The mouth of this lake is located in the municipality of Château-Richer, at:
  west of a mountain peak reaching ;
  north-west of a mountain peak reaching ;
  north-west of the north-west bank of the St. Lawrence River;
  south-east of the confluence of the Rouge East River and the Rouge River (Montmorency River).

  to the south, then to the east, partly crossing Lac du Bord, to its mouth;

The Rouge River East flows on the East bank of the Rouge river. From this confluence of the Rouge River East, the current descends on  towards the northwest by following the course of the Rouge River, then descends on  generally towards the south by the course of the Montmorency River, up to the northwest bank of the Saint Lawrence River.

Toponymy 
The toponyms "Rivière Rouge" and "Rivière Rouge Est" are linked.

The toponym "Rivière Rouge Est" was officialized on December 13, 1996 at the Commission de toponymie du Québec.

Notes and references

Appendices

See also 
 La Côte-de-Beaupré Regional County Municipality
 Château-Richer, a municipality
 Rouge River
 Montmorency River
 List of rivers of Quebec

Bibliography 
 

Rivers of Capitale-Nationale
La Côte-de-Beaupré Regional County Municipality